The Little Killers were an American rock and roll band who formed in New York City, New York, U.S. in 2001. They played punky garage rock inspired by the likes of Chuck Berry, the New York Dolls, and Johnny Burnette's Rock & Roll Trio.

The band featured vocalist and guitarist Andy Maltz, the rhythm sections of Sara Nelson (bass and backing vocals) and Kari Boden (drums and backing vocals).

After signing to Crypt Records, The Little Killers released their self-titled début album in September 2003. It became a hit in garage punk circles, although it didn't make the band as big as label-mates such as Jon Spencer Blues Explosion.

They also released two non-album singles, "Better Be Right" (2003) and "You Got It Made" (2004). That year also saw them play one of the final Peel Sessions broadcasts from the legendary John Peel radio show, before he died in 2004.

In 2006, they released their second and final album, A Real Good One, on the Gern Blandsten Records label.

The Little Killers toured extensively in the US, Europe, and Australia before disbanding in 2007.

References

Garage rock groups from New York (state)
Garage punk groups